Abali Rural District is in Rudehen District of Damavand County, Tehran province, Iran. The center is in Abali, which as a city is not part of the rural district. At the National Census of 2006, its population was 2,047 in 578 households. There were 2,534 inhabitants in 778 households at the following census of 2011. At the most recent census of 2016, the population of the rural district was 2,902 in 951 households. The largest of its 13 villages was Sadat Mahalleh, with 1,397 people.

References 

Damavand County

Rural Districts of Tehran Province

Populated places in Tehran Province

Populated places in Damavand County